Kahoru is a Japanese feminine given name. It may be written in hiragana or with various ateji. People with this name include:
 Kahoru Furuya (1908-2022), Japanese supercentenarian
 Kahoru Kohiruimaki (born 1967), Japanese singer
 Kahoru Sasajima (born 1974), Japanese voice actress
 Kahoru Kitazawa, character in Battle Royale

References

Japanese feminine given names